Charles Parel (25 November 1893 – 6 March 1981) was a Swiss racing cyclist. He rode in the 1921 Tour de France.

References

1893 births
1981 deaths
Swiss male cyclists
Place of birth missing